Grossera elongata is a species of plant in the family Euphorbiaceae. It is endemic to Príncipe.

References

Aleuritideae
Flora of Príncipe
Vulnerable plants
Endemic flora of São Tomé and Príncipe
Taxonomy articles created by Polbot